Luis Eduardo Reyes (born 27 January 1954) is a former Colombian football defender.

Career
Born in Candelaria, Valle del Cauca, Reyes played club football for América de Cali. He won six Colombian league titles with América, and helped the club to three consecutive runner-up finishes in the Copa Libertadores. He scored the game-winning goal in the final game of the 1984 championship which secured the club's fourth league title.

Reyes made 20 appearances for the Colombia national football team from 1979 to 1985, and he played at the Copa América 1979.

References

External links

1954 births
Living people
Colombian footballers
Colombia international footballers
América de Cali footballers
Categoría Primera A players
Association football defenders
Sportspeople from Valle del Cauca Department